William Elmer Forsythe (August 22, 1881 — June 30, 1969) was an American physicist and President of the Optical Society of America.

Forsythe received his bachelor's degree from Denison University and went on to obtain a Master's and PhD at the University of Wisconsin. He was awarded the honorary degree of doctor of science from Kenyon College in 1926. In 1924 he was appointed Director of the NELA Research Laboratory in Cleveland, Ohio. During World War II he was associated with the Office of Scientific Research and Development as well as the National Defense Research Committee. He was elected member emeritus and fellow of the Illuminating Engineering Society. He served as president of the Optical Society of America from 1926 to 1927.

He died on June 30, 1969.

See also
The Optical Society

References

External links
 Articles Published by early OSA Presidents Journal of the Optical Society of America

20th-century American physicists
Presidents of Optica (society)
1881 births
1969 deaths